, often referred to as TUFS, is a specialist research university in Fuchū, Tokyo, Japan.

TUFS is primarily devoted to foreign language, international affairs and foreign studies. It also features an Asia-African institution.

History
The University is the oldest academic institution devoted to international studies in Japan.

It was subsequently established as an independent educational and research institution with the name  in 1899.

In 1999, the University celebrated both the 126th anniversary of its original establishment and the 100th anniversary of its independence. The campus was moved to its present location, where students can study in a modern, hi-tech environment.

Departments
There are 26 departments of language, i.e. the languages students can major at TUFS. Some languages are rarely taught in Japan or elsewhere the world.
Japanese Studies
Japanese
East Asian Studies
Chinese
Korean
Mongolian
Southeast Asian Studies
Indonesian
Malaysian
Tagalog (Filipino)
Thai
Laotian
Vietnamese
Cambodian (Khmer)
Burmese
South and West Asian Studies
Arabic
Bengali
Hindi
Persian
Turkish
Urdu
European and American Studies I
English
German
European and American Studies II
French
Italian
Spanish
Portuguese
Russian and East European Studies
Russian
Polish
Czech

Affiliated institutions and organizations

Affiliated institutions and organizations at the university include:
The  (ILCAA)

Campus and dormitories

The primary TUFS campus in Fuchu is situated in Asahi-cho near Tama Station of the Seibu Tamagawa Line. Classes are mainly held in the Research and Lecture building and, for international students, the Japanese Language Center. The campus also features a library, gymnasium, sports field, cafeteria, and small shop, with another convenience store located adjacent to the North Arrival Court.

On-site accommodation is available to international students and local students, in the form of the three International Residence Halls located at the ‘rear’ of the campus by the sports field. Two of the buildings provide studio apartment-sized single rooms for incoming students, as well as a limited number of ‘family’-sized apartments. Arranged in a wedge-shaped configuration, two sides of the wedge are lined with rooms, with an uncovered atrium in the centre. Completed first, amenities such as a communal kitchen and music room are located in Building 1. Building 2, completed later and featured to the right, moves the showers (and hot water supply) out of the individual rooms and to a communal shower and laundry area located on each floor. The newest Building 3 is located next to Building 2 and offers single rooms to international and local students.

SWA Group, a prominent landscape architecture firm, designed a gathering space for the campus, repurposing a former military base to create a multifunctional space suitable for social gatherings as well as studying. The space honors the Japanese belief that trees represent souls and SWA carefully transplanted or incorporated all of the trees from the existing forest. Beyond being featured in Roger Yee's Educational Environments and Walter Roger's textbook Professional Practice of Landscape Architecture: A Complete Guide to Starting and Running Your Own Firm, the plaza won a National ASLA Design Merit Award in 2003.

School Festival (Gakkosai) 
The School Festival of TUFS, Gakkosai, which usually takes place in the end of November, is known for its originality. Freshmen provide food of the countries they major in and Sophomore plays drama in the language they major. The plays are called gogeki (language plays). They sometimes use drama texts written in the language, but they often translate works in another language by themselves. Gogeki was given some grant by Japanese government.

List of Exchange Universities
TUFS has partner universities in 35 countries.
 Taiwan
 National Chengchi University
 National Taiwan University
 Indonesia
 Gajah Mada University
 University of Indonesia
 Malaysia 
 National University of Malaysia
 South Korea
 Yonsei University
 Seoul National University
 Hankuk University of Foreign Studies
 Laos
 National University of Laos
 Mongolia
 National University of Mongolia
 Philippines
 University of the Philippines Diliman
 Thailand
 Srinakharinwirot University
 Vietnam
 University of Social Sciences and Humanities, VNU (Former Hanoi University)
 Singapore
 National University of Singapore
 India
 University of Delhi
 Cambodia
 Royal University of Phnom Penh
 China
 Shanghai International Studies University
 Hong Kong
 The Chinese University of Hong Kong
 The University of Hong Kong
 Australia
 The Australian National University
 Brazil
 Universidade Federal do Parana
 Universidade do Estado do Rio de Janeiro
 Turkey
 Ankara University
 Boğaziçi University
 Çanakkale 18 Mart University
 Syria
 University of Damascus
 Egypt
 Cairo University
 Ain Shams University
 Canada
 University of British Columbia
 United States
 University of California, San Diego
 Cornell University
 California State University, Fresno
 Columbia University
 University at Albany, State University of New York
 Mills College
 Uzbekistan
 Tashkent State Institute of Oriental Studies
 Czech Republic
 Charles University in Prague
 Palacký University Olomouc
 France
 Universite de la Sorbonne Nouvelle-Paris III
 Institut d'Etudes Politiques de Paris
 Institut National Des Langues et Civilisations Orientales de Paris
 Ireland
 University College Cork
 Italy
 Instituto Universitario Orientale di Napoli
 Universita degli Studi di Venezia
 Universita degli Studi di Torino
 Portugal
 Universidade de Coimbra
 Spain
 Autonomous University of Madrid
 Autonomous University of Barcelona
 University of Seville
 Pompeu Fabra University
 United Kingdom
 School of Oriental and African Studies, University of London
 Leeds University
 University of Manchester
 University of Essex
 Russia
 Russian State University for the Humanities
 Germany
 Philipps-Universität Marburg
 Friedrich-Alexander-Universität Erlangen-Nürnberg
 Justus-Liebig-Universität Gießen
 Universität Bielefeld
 Georg-August-Universität Göttingen

Evaluation from Business World

Notable alumni and faculty members

Alumni
Futabatei Shimei, novelist
Nitobe Inazō, educator
 Firoz Mahmud, visual artist, Bangladesh
Jinzai Kiyoshi, novelist
Jun Ishikawa, author
Masahiko Shimada, author
Nankichi Niimi, author
Chūya Nakahara, poet
Kafū Nagai, author
Mari Yonehara, essayist
Oh Seon-hwa, Professor at Takushoku University
Hamada Kazuyuki, politician, Member of the House of Councillors, Parliamentary Vice-Ministers for Foreign Affairs
Hashimoto Ben, politician, Member of the House of Representatives of Japan
Hashimoto Mantaro, linguist and sinologist
Hiroshi Saitō, politician, former Governor of Yamagata Prefecture
Uchiyama Iwataro, politician, former Governor of Kanagawa Prefecture
Nakajima Mineo, First President of Akita International University, a former President of Tokyo University of Foreign Studies
Sakai Kuniya, President of Kanda University of International Studies
Sakae Osugi, Anarchist
Yasuhiko Nagano, Deputy Director-General of Graduate University for Advanced Studies, Professor Emeritus of National Museum of Ethnology (Japan)
Matsuzono Makio, Professor Emeritus, Fourth Director-General of National Museum of Ethnology (Japan)
Hiroji Kataoka, Professor of Urdu at Daito Bunka University
Shinji Maejima, Orientalist
Okakura Kakuzō, scholar
Maeda Yoshinori, Tenth President of NHK
Morohoshi Sayaka, journalist
Okakura Kakuzō, scholar
Shinichiro Sawai, Film Director
Yoshio Ōkubo, President of Nippon Television
Yukihide Takekawa, singer-songwriter, Vocalist of Godiego
Yūko Nakamura, actress
Genki Hitomi, Singer, Vocalist of Vow Wow
Aoki Satoshi, former Chairperson of Honda, a former Chairperson of Japan Automobile Manufacturers Association
Yamashita Hideki, President of Shueisha
Murakami Koichi, former President of Fuji Television
Hasegawa Kouji, first CEO of Shuto Expressway
Mizukami Kenya, former Chairperson of Yomiuri Shimbun
Arakawa Shoshi, CEO of Bridgestone
Fujiwara Sakuya, former Bank of Japan Vice President
Saiga Fumiko, former Judge of the International Criminal Court, a former Japanese Ambassador to the United Nations
Sato Satoru, Japanese Ambassador to Spain
Yamamoto Keiji, Japanese Ambassador in charge of Inspection
Komano Kinichi, Japanese Ambassador to Iran
Nishioka Atsushi, Japanese Ambassador to Djibouti
Sato Soichi, Japanese Ambassador to Dominican Republic
Hoshi Hideaki, Japanese Ambassador to Estonia
Myoui Ryozo, Japanese Ambassador to Angola
Minagawa Kazuo, Japanese Ambassador to Uganda
Fujita Tadashi, former Japanese Ambassador in charge of disarmament and nonproliferation
Tanaka Saburo, former Japanese Ambassador to Cuba, Deputy director of Naicho
Inoue Masayuki, former Japanese Ambassador to Bangladesh
Hanada Marohito, former Japanese Ambassador to Mongolia
Kidokoro Takuo, former Japanese Ambassador to Mongolia
Nakasone Goro, former Japanese Ambassador to Paraguay
Honda Hitoshi, former Japanese Ambassador to Finland
Tokura Eiji, former Japanese Ambassador to Sweden
Arai Koichi, Last Japanese Ambassador to East Germany
Tanabe Ryuichi, former Japanese Ambassador to Poland
Katsu Shigeo, Vice President of World Bank
Kanbara Masanao, CEO of Mitsubishi Rayon
Kuwahara Michio, CEO of Daiei
Shimizu Shinjiro, former President of Mitsui & Co.
Kodera Kei, former President of Toys "R" Us(Japan)
Hidaka Nobuhiko, President of GartnerJapan
Keizo Morikawa, President of Cosmo Oil
Melt-Banana, musician
Jalsan, tulku and Professor of Mongolian at Inner Mongolia University
Takuma Nakahira, Photographer and Photography Critic
 Yasuhiro Matsuda, professor of University of Tokyo (international politic), Yasuhiro Nakasone Award (2011)

Faculty
Daryoush Ashouri, visiting professor
Isolde Standish is an Australian and British Humanities Scholar and Film theorist specialised in East Asia.
Kitamura Hajime, linguist
Masao Yamaguchi, anthropologist, professor emeritus
Nakae Chomin, former president
Tadahiko Shintani, linguist
Takeshi Suzuki, professor of Urdu
Ram Prakash Dwivedi, Visiting Professor

Academic rankings

TUFS is a specialized institution only in foreign language, international affairs and foreign studies, thus it is not as well known as other big universities such as University of Tokyo and Kyoto University. However, its prestigious position in Japan can be seen in the several rankings below.

General rankings
The university has been ranked 34th, 23rd and 20th out of 181 major universities during 2008–2010 in the ranking called "Truly strong universities(本当に強い大学)" by Toyo Keizai.

According to the survey conducted by Nikkei HR in 2013, the TUFS won the first place in "working skills" ranking among Japanese universities. It shows that students grow their "working skills" through their studies at the university and they will learn faster and be operational once they have started their career.

Research performance
Weekly Diamond reported that TUFS has the 5th highest research standard in Japan in terms of research fundings per researcher in COE Program. In the same article, it's also ranked 3rd in terms of the quality of education by GP funds per student.

Alumni rankings
According to the Weekly Economist's 2010 rankings, graduates from TUFS have the 16th best employment rate in 400 major companies.

École des Mines de Paris ranks TUFS University as 92nd in the world in 2011 in terms of the number of alumni listed among CEOs in the 500 largest worldwide companies, although TUFS is a smaller university compared to other Japanese universities in the ranking.

Popularity and selectivity
TUFS is one of the most selective universities in Japan. Its entrance difficulty is usually considered one of the top among 180 national and public universities.

Notes

External links
 TUFS website

 
Japanese national universities
Educational institutions established in 1873
1873 establishments in Japan
Fuchū, Tokyo
Universities and colleges in Tokyo